Joe Sosnowski (born April 13, 1977) is a member of the Illinois House of Representatives, first sworn in to represent the 69th district in 2010. The district he represents includes the municipalities of Belvidere, Caledonia, Capron, Cherry Valley, Loves Park, Machesney Park, Roscoe, South Beloit, Timberlane.

Biography

Early life
Joe Sosnowski was born April 13, 1977, in Hanover Park, IL. He grew up in Carol Stream, IL and graduated from West Chicago High School in 1995. In 1999, Sosnowski graduated from Northern Illinois University in DeKalb, Illinois with a Bachelor of Arts in English and a minor in Political Science.

Personal
In addition to his job as State Representative, Sosnowski currently works as the Director of Institutional Advancement at Rockford Christian Schools in Rockford.  He presently holds an Illinois Real Estate License, has previously worked in real estate management and leasing and is the former Vice President of Commercial Real Estate for Buckley Real Estate in Rockford. Sosnowski is a regional board member of Children's Home and Aid, and was a 2008 recipient of the Rockford Chamber of Commerce's "40 Under 40" Award, which recognizes young leaders from the Rockford, IL region.  Sosnowski married Roxanne Swedlund in 2001 and they have three children.

Political career
Sosnowski served a four-year term as Seventh Ward Alderman on the DeKalb City Council from 1999 - 2003.  In 2005, he was elected to the office of First Ward Alderman on the Rockford City Council, and in 2009, he was re-elected to that same office.  While on the Rockford City Council, he served as the Chairman of the Planning and Development Committee and was also a member of the Codes and Regulations Committee.  In his 2010 race for the 69th State Representative seat, Sosnowski was endorsed by the Chicago Tribune and the Rockford Register Star.  He won the general election held on November 2, 2010 and was sworn into the Illinois House of Representatives on January 12, 2011.

As of July 3, 2022, Representative Joe Sosnowski is a member of the following Illinois House committees:

 Child Care Access & Early Childhood Education Committee (HCEC)
 Cities & Villages Committee (HCIV)
 Elementary & Secondary Education: Administration, Licenses & Charter Committee (HELO)
 Income Tax Subcommittee (HREF-INTX)
 Operations Subcommittee (HSGA-OPER)
 Procurement Subcommittee (HSGA-PROC)
 Revenue & Finance Committee (HREF)
 State Government Administration Committee (HSGA)

References

External links
 Representative Joe Sosnowski (R) 69th District at the Illinois General Assembly
By session: 98th, 97th
 Joe Sosnowski for State Representative
 
 Rep. Joe Sosnowski at Illinois House Republican Caucus

1977 births
Republican Party members of the Illinois House of Representatives
Living people
Northern Illinois University alumni
People from Carol Stream, Illinois
Politicians from Rockford, Illinois
American politicians of Polish descent
People from Hanover Park, Illinois
21st-century American politicians